Borris is a small railway town in Ringkøbing-Skjern Municipality, Denmark, with a population of 860 (1 January 2022).

Borris Church is located in the town.

Borris Skydeterræn (Borris Shooting Ranges) is situated south of the town on the largest heath in Denmark.

References

Cities and towns in the Central Denmark Region